Astenus sultanicus is a species of rove beetles first found in Turkey.

References

Further reading
Anlaş, Sinan. "On the subgenus Eurysunius Reitter in Turkey III. A new species from western Anatolia and additional records (Coleoptera: Staphylinidae, Paederinae, Astenus)." Turkish Journal of Entomology 40.1 (2016).
ANLAŞ, Sinan. "A new species of Astenus (Eurysunius) Dejean, 1833 from Turkey (Coleoptera: Staphylinidae, Paederinae)." Türkiye Entomoloji Dergisi38.3 (2014): 239–243.

Paederinae
Fauna of Turkey